Hollywood is the second studio album by Australian indie rock band Little Birdy. The album was recorded in Los Angeles and produced by John King of the production duo The Dust Brothers and engineer Clif Norrell.

The first single released from the album was "Come On Come On", which reached number 18 on its debut on the Australian ARIA Singles Charts and was one of the top most requested songs on Triple J.

The second single from the album, "Bodies", was released on 23 January 2007. A limited edition copy of the album was also released with a bonus DVD The Making of Hollywood and the "Come On Come On" video clip.

In March 2007, the album was certified gold by the Australian Recording Industry Association.

Background 

"Actually the initial title for the album was actually going to be Inside I’m Crying, Outside I’m Dancing which kind of describes the feeling for the album as a whole but in the end we decided on Hollywood" explains Katy. "I wrote the title song a few weeks before we even starting looking into where to record the album and as far as we knew we were probably going to record somewhere in the UK. It was weird that the song came before we knew we were going there."
"We had pretty much all of the album demo’d before going over to record with John so we were in a much better position mentally than the first album." says drummer Matt.
"I think there was actually a lot less pressure on us this time around. At least this time we knew our audience and knew what to expect, so that made it easier" agrees bassist Scott.

Track listing

Charts

Certifications

References 

2006 albums
Albums produced by John King (record producer)
Eleven: A Music Company albums
Little Birdy albums